Aha ha is a species of Australian wasp, named by the entomologist Arnold Menke in 1977 as a joke. Menke described several years after its discovery how, when he received a package from a colleague containing insect specimens, he exclaimed "Aha, a new genus", with fellow entomologist Eric Grissell responding "ha" doubtfully. The name of the insect is commonly found in lists of bizarre scientific names. The name was also used as the vehicle registration plate of Menke's car, "AHA HA".

See also
List of short species names

References

Crabronidae
Hymenoptera of Australia
Insects described in 1977
Humour in science